Butler Community Mausoleum is a historic mausoleum located in Butler Cemetery near Butler in Stafford Township, DeKalb County, Indiana.  It was built in 1914, and is a one-story, limestone structure with a red tile roof and simple Classical Revival style detail.  It measures 36 feet wide and 78 feet deep and consists of a tall vestibule section and long nave-like wing with clerestory.  At the entrance are flanking Doric order columns.  The mausoleum was used for interments into the 1960s.

It was added to the National Register of Historic Places in 2014.

References

Monuments and memorials on the National Register of Historic Places in Indiana
Neoclassical architecture in Indiana
Buildings and structures completed in 1914
Buildings and structures in DeKalb County, Indiana
National Register of Historic Places in DeKalb County, Indiana
Mausoleums on the National Register of Historic Places
1914 establishments in Indiana
Death in Indiana